French Camp (from Campo de los Franceses, Spanish for "Field of the Frenchmen") is an unincorporated community in San Joaquin County, California, United States. The population was 3,770 as of the 2020 census. Up from 3,376 at the 2010 census, and down from 4,109 at the 2000 census. For statistical purposes, the United States Census Bureau has defined French Camp as a census-designated place (CDP). The census definition of the area may not precisely correspond to local understanding of the area with the same name.  

French Camp is the location of the U.S. Army Sharpe Depot and the GSA Western Distribution Center, and is the oldest settlement in San Joaquin County.  San Joaquin General Hospital is located in French Camp.  It is also the location of the county jail, the county juvenile hall and the county children's shelter, which combine to form a sizable percentage of the place's population.

Geography 

French Camp is located at  (37.882742, -121.279788).

Climate 

According to the Köppen Climate Classification system, French Camp has a warm-summer Mediterranean climate, abbreviated "Csa" on climate maps.

History
French Camp was the southernmost regular camp site of the Hudson's Bay Company southern fur brigades sent from Fort Vancouver (now Vancouver, Washington), established by Michel Laframboise in 1832. Its Spanish name was preserved in a land grant dated January 13, 1844 as Rancho Campo de los Franceses. It is commemorated as California State Historic Landmark 668:
Here was the terminus of the Oregon-California trail used by the French-Canadian trappers employed by the Hudson's Bay Company from about 1832 to 1845. Michel Laframboise, among others, met fur hunters here annually, where they camped with their families. In 1844 Charles Maria Weber and William Gulnac promoted the first white settlers' colony on "Rancho del Campo de Los Franceses" which included French Camp and the site of Stockton.
French Camp was also known as Castoria, the Latin word for "beaver" being "castor", reflecting its central role in the California Fur Rush.

French Camp was strategically sited at the southern end of the southernmost slough (which became known as French Camp Slough) of the Sacramento-San Joaquin Delta, maximizing the use of the waterway for ease of transportation.  A trail led off from the site to the southeast into the foothills of the Sierra Nevada Mountains.  It was subsequently used as an alternate route for the Mariposa Road, part of the Stockton-Los Angeles Road, especially favored during the rainy season because of its exceptional drainage.  The route was eventually paved and exists to this day as "French Camp Road".

During WWII, Japanese Americans that lived in French Camp were relocated to civilian assembly centers and relocation centers overseen by the War Relocation Authority (WRA) in accordance with Executive Order 9066. Japanese Americans from French Camp were sent to the Turlock Assembly Center at the Stanislaus County Fair, Manzanar War Relocation Center, and the Gila River War Relocation Center. Accounts of the relocation and life in the camps are detailed through letters from former students of the French Camp Grammar School.

Notable people
 Scott Brooks, assistant coach for the Portland Trail Blazers
 José M. Hernández, astronaut
 Gilbert Luján, painter and sculptor
 Phil Spector, record producer, musician, and songwriter (died in San Joaquin General Hospital)
 Chi Cheng, bassist for Deftones (declared dead at San Joaquin General Hospital)

Demographics

2010
At the 2010 census French Camp had a population of 3,376. The racial makeup of French Camp was 1,678 (49.7%) White, 410 (12.1%) African American, 31 (0.9%) Native American, 163 (4.8%) Asian, 11 (0.3%) Pacific Islander, 920 (27.3%) from other races, and 163 (4.8%) from two or more races. Hispanic or Latino of any race were 1,748 persons (51.8%).

The census reported that 1,622 people (48.0% of the population) lived in households, 336 (10.0%) lived in non-institutionalized group quarters, and 1,418 (42.0%) were institutionalized.

There were 509 households, 202 (39.7%) had children under the age of 18 living in them, 262 (51.5%) were opposite-sex married couples living together, 64 (12.6%) had a female householder with no husband present, 46 (9.0%) had a male householder with no wife present.  There were 46 (9.0%) unmarried opposite-sex partnerships, and 3 (0.6%) same-sex married couples or partnerships. 104 households (20.4%) were one person and 43 (8.4%) had someone living alone who was 65 or older. The average household size was 3.19.  There were 372 families (73.1% of households); the average family size was 3.71.

The age distribution was 731 people (21.7%) under the age of 18, 604 people (17.9%) aged 18 to 24, 1,145 people (33.9%) aged 25 to 44, 660 people (19.5%) aged 45 to 64, and 236 people (7.0%) who were 65 or older.  The median age was 30.1 years. For every 100 females, there were 193.1 males.  For every 100 females age 18 and over, there were 208.6 males.

There were 575 housing units at an average density of 183.0 per square mile, of the occupied units 276 (54.2%) were owner-occupied and 233 (45.8%) were rented. The homeowner vacancy rate was 3.5%; the rental vacancy rate was 13.4%.  872 people (25.8% of the population) lived in owner-occupied housing units and 750 people (22.2%) lived in rental housing units.

2000
At the 2000 census there were 4,109 people, 576 households, and 438 families in the CDP. The racial makeup of the CDP was 44.20% White, 11.97% African American, 0.80% Native American, 4.45% Asian, 0.46% Pacific Islander, 32.12% from other races, and 5.99% from two or more races. Hispanic or Latino of any race were 44.95%.

Of the 576 households 37.8% had children under the age of 18 living with them, 51.4% were married couples living together, 15.1% had a female householder with no husband present, and 23.8% were non-families. 19.3% of households were one person and 7.8% were one person aged 65 or older.  The average household size was 3.14 and the average family size was 3.57.

The age distribution was 24.5% under the age of 18, 14.9% from 18 to 24, 39.2% from 25 to 44, 15.2% from 45 to 64, and 6.1% 65 or older.  The median age was 30 years. For every 100 females, there were 182.6 males.  For every 100 females age 18 and over, there were 192.1 males.

The median household income was $28,295 and the median family income  was $29,034. Males had a median income of $30,556 versus $17,083 for females. The per capita income for the CDP was $9,945.  About 27.1% of families and 40.8% of the population were below the poverty line, including 40.3% of those under age 18 and 12.9% of those age 65 or over.

References

External links
 http://sanjoaquinhistory.org/blog/?tag=indian-history  San Joaquin County Historical Society

Census-designated places in San Joaquin County, California
Census-designated places in California